Sorelle Alaina Friedler is an American computer scientist who is an Associate Professor at Haverford College. She is the co-founder Association for Computing Machinery Conference on Fairness, Accountability, and Transparency. Her research seeks to prevent discrimination in machine learning.

Early life and education 
Friedler earned her bachelor's degree at Swarthmore College. She moved to the University of Maryland, College Park for her graduate studies, where she studied geometric algorithms.

Research and career 
Friedler joined Alphabet Inc. as a software engineer, where she worked with X on the development of weather balloons that can provide internet access to remote communities.

Friedler has advocated for the careful use of artificial intelligence and machine learning. In particular, she has spoken about how biased data and algorithms reinforce social inequality. In 2015 she was made a Fellow at the Data & Society Research Institute.

Friedler has worked with Josh Schrier and Alexander Norquist on the application of data mining to accelerate materials discovery. They created a computer algorithm capable of predicting whether a set of reagents will create a crystalline materials when mixed in a solvent and heated. To create the tool, they compiled a database of almost 4,000 chemical reactions, wrote an algorithm that could mine for patterns in data and provide insight about why some experiments fail while others succeed. The algorithm was correct 89% of the time, whilst researchers (human) predictions only had a 78% success rate. Friedler and her co-workers published the database online (darkreactions.haverford.edu/) to encourage other researchers to share their data.

Awards and honors 

 2006 AT&T Labs Fellowship Program 
 2009 Ann G. Wylie Dissertation Fellowship
 2019 Chace/Parker Teaching Award
 2019 Mozilla Responsible Computer Science Challenge

Selected publications

Personal life 
Friedler is married to Rebecca Benjamin.

References

External links 

Year of birth missing (living people)
Living people
American computer scientists
American women computer scientists
Researchers in geometric algorithms
Swarthmore College alumni
University of Maryland, College Park alumni
Haverford College faculty
American women academics
21st-century American women